This article contains links to lists of hospitals in the United States, including U.S. States, the national capital of Washington, D.C., insular areas, and outlying islands.  Links to more detailed state lists are shown.

U.S. states
As of 2020, there were 5,250 acute care and critical access hospitals in the United States.  In the decade from 2010 to 2020, dozens of hospitals have closed in rural areas of the United States, particularly in the southeast. Of the 3,143 county-equivalents in the United States, there were 700 counties in the United States with no hospitals as of 2020.  The following list contains links to the lists and the number of articles in the main category for each state. There may be additional psychiatric, county, and teaching hospitals not included in the main category.

Insular areas
Lists or actual hospitals in insular areas of the United States include:
List of hospitals in American Samoa (total: 1)
List of hospitals in Guam (total: 3)
List of hospitals in the Northern Mariana Islands (total: 1)
List of hospitals in Puerto Rico
List of hospitals in the United States Virgin Islands (total: 2)

Freely associated states:
List of hospitals in the Federated States of Micronesia (total: 5)
List of hospitals in the Marshall Islands (total: 3)
List of hospitals in Palau (total: 1)

Outlying islands
Lists of hospitals in outlying islands of the United States include:
Baker Island, none currently, uninhabited
Howland Island, none currently, uninhabited
Jarvis Island, none currently, uninhabited
Johnston Atoll, none currently, underground hospital during World War II (19391941)
Kingman Reef, none currently, uninhabited
Midway Atoll, none currently
Navassa Island, none currently, uninhabited
Palmyra Atoll, none currently, unoccupied
Wake Island, none currently, field hospitals during the Vietnam War to assist refugees

See also
Lists of specific types of hospitals:
List of burn centers in the United States
List of children's hospitals in the United States
List of public hospitals in the United States
List of trauma centers in the United States
List of sanatoria in the United States
List of the oldest hospitals in the United States
List of Veterans Affairs medical facilities
List of Veterans Affairs medical facilities by state
Combat support hospital
List of United States Navy hospital ships

Lists of New York City hospitals 
 List of hospitals in New York City
 List of hospitals in the Bronx
 List of hospitals in Brooklyn
 List of hospitals in Manhattan
 List of hospitals in Queens
 List of hospitals on Staten Island

References

 
Lists of organizations based in the United States
US
History of medicine in the United States